VV Heerjansdam is a football club from Heerjansdam, Netherlands. Heerjansdam is playing in the Saturday Eerste Klasse League since 2017.

Heerjansdam was the Dutch amateur champions of Saturday football in 1989. In 1986 Heerjansdam became champions in the Saturday Eerste Klasse A. At the time, the Eerste Klasse was the highest league for amateur teams.

In 1984, Heerjansdam defeated Eredivisie-side FC Groningen (3–2) in the first round of the 1984–85 KNVB Cup. In the second round, Heerjansdam was eliminated by Ajax (6-0).

Associated people

Former players
 Prince Polley – Ghanaian footballer
 Nikki de Roest – Former Dutch international and Women's Eredivisie player. She played on a boys team in Heerjansdam.

Managers
 1988–89: René Vermunt
 1999–2001: Pieter de Jongh
 2019–20: Ron Timmers
 Since 2020: Jonathan Jonk

References

External links
 Official site

Football clubs in the Netherlands
1945 establishments in the Netherlands
Football clubs in South Holland
Football in Zwijndrecht, Netherlands
Association football clubs established in 1945